Brogden can refer to:

People
 Curtis Hooks Brogden (1816–1901), North Carolina governor
 Gwendoline Brogden (1891–1973), British stage actress
 John Brogden (1969–), NSW politician
 John Brogden (1798–1869), English industrialist, or one of his sons and business partners: 
 John Brogden Jun. (1823–1855) 
 Alexander Brogden (1825–1892)
 Henry Brogden (1828–1913)
 James Brogden (1832–1907)
 Leon Brogden (1910–2000), Sports coach
 Stan Brogden (1910–1981), British Rugby League footballer
 Willis J. Brogden (1877–1935), Justice of the North Carolina Supreme Court

Places
 Brogden, Lancashire, England
 Brogden, North Carolina, USA
 Brogden Middle School, a school in Durham, North Carolina

Other uses
 John Brogden and Sons  Railway Contracts, Coal and Iron Mines, Iron Smelting.
 Brogden v Metropolitan Rly Co, English contract law case.
Brogden (avocado), an avocado cultivar